Camilla Friedlander later Camilla Edle von Malheim Friedländer (1856−1928) was an Austrian painter. She was known for her still lifes.

Biography
Friedlander was born in Vienna on 10 December 1856. She was taught by her father Friedrich Friedländer.

The Emperor of Austria bought her painting "Orientalische Gegenstände", which had been exhibited at the Vienna Künstlerhaus.

Friedlander  exhibited her work at the Palace of Fine Arts at the 1893 World's Columbian Exposition in Chicago, Illinois.

In 1901 Friedlander became a nun, entering the Salesian Monastery.

She died in Vienna on 3 October 1928.

Gallery

References

External links
 
images of Camilla Friedlander's paintings on artNET

1862 births
1928 deaths
19th-century Austrian women artists
19th-century Austrian painters
20th-century Austrian women artists
Artists from Vienna
Austrian women painters